The Battle of Lepanto was a naval engagement that took place on 7 October 1571 when a fleet of the Holy League, a coalition of Catholic states (comprising Spain and its Italian territories, several independent Italian states, and the Sovereign Military Order of Malta) arranged by Pope Pius V, inflicted a major defeat on the fleet of the Ottoman Empire in the Gulf of Patras. The Ottoman forces were sailing westward from their naval station in Lepanto (the Venetian name of ancient Naupactus – Greek , Turkish ) when they met the fleet of the Holy League which was sailing east from Messina, Sicily. The Spanish Empire and the Venetian Republic were the main powers of the coalition, as the league was largely financed by Philip II of Spain, and Venice was the main contributor of ships.

In the history of naval warfare, Lepanto marks the last major engagement in the Western world to be fought almost entirely between rowing vessels, namely the galleys and galleasses which were the direct descendants of ancient trireme warships. The battle was in essence an "infantry battle on floating platforms". It was the largest naval battle in Western history since classical antiquity, involving more than 400 warships. Over the following decades, the increasing importance of the galleon and the line of battle tactic would displace the galley as the major warship of its era, marking the beginning of the "Age of Sail".

The victory of the Holy League is of great importance in the history of Europe and of the Ottoman Empire, marking the turning-point of Ottoman military expansion into the Mediterranean, although the Ottoman wars in Europe would continue for another century. It has long been compared to the Battle of Salamis, both for tactical parallels and for its crucial importance in the defense of Europe against imperial expansion. It was also of great symbolic importance in a period when Europe was torn by its own wars of religion following the Protestant Reformation. Pope Pius V instituted the feast of Our Lady of Victory, and Philip II of Spain used the victory to strengthen his position as the "Most Catholic King" and defender of Christendom against Muslim incursion. Historian Paul K. Davis writes that

More than a military victory, Lepanto was a moral one. For decades, the Ottoman Turks had terrified Europe, and the victories of Suleiman the Magnificent caused Christian Europe serious concern. The defeat at Lepanto further exemplified the rapid deterioration of Ottoman might under Selim II, and Christians rejoiced at this setback for the Ottomans. The mystique of Ottoman power was tarnished significantly by this battle, and Christian Europe was heartened.

Background 

The Christian coalition had been promoted by Pope Pius V to rescue the Venetian colony of Famagusta on the island of Cyprus, which was being besieged by the Turks in early 1571 subsequent to the fall of Nicosia and other Venetian possessions in Cyprus in the course of 1570. On 1 August the Venetians had surrendered after being reassured that they could leave Cyprus freely. However, the Ottoman commander, Lala Kara Mustafa Pasha, who had lost some 50,000 men in the siege, broke his word, imprisoning the Venetians. On 17 August Marco Antonio Bragadin was flayed alive and his corpse hung on Mustafa's galley together with the heads of the Venetian commanders, Astorre Baglioni, Alvise Martinengo, and Gianantonio Querini.

The members of the Holy League were the Republic of Venice, the Spanish Empire (including the Kingdom of Naples, the Habsburg monarchy, the Kingdoms of Sicily and Sardinia as part of the Spanish possessions), the Papal States, the Republic of Genoa, the Duchies of Savoy, Urbino and Tuscany, the Knights Hospitaller, and others.

The banner for the fleet, blessed by the Pope, reached the Kingdom of Naples (then ruled by Philip II of Spain) on 14 August 1571. There, in the Basilica of Santa Chiara, it was solemnly consigned to John of Austria (Don Juan de Austria), who had been named the leader of the coalition after long discussions among the allies. The fleet moved to Sicily and, leaving Messina, reached (after several stops) the port of Viscardo in Cephalonia, where news arrived of the fall of Famagusta and of the torture inflicted by the Turks on the Venetian commander of the fortress, Marco Antonio Bragadin.

All members of the alliance viewed the Ottoman navy as a significant threat, both to the security of maritime trade in the Mediterranean Sea and to the security of continental Europe itself. Spain was the largest financial contributor, though the Spaniards preferred to preserve most of their galleys for Spain's own wars against the nearby sultanates of the Barbary Coast rather than expend its naval strength for the benefit of Venice. The combined Christian fleet was placed under the command of John of Austria with Marcantonio Colonna as his principal deputy. The various Christian contingents met the main force, that of Venice (under Sebastiano Venier, later Doge of Venice), in July and August 1571 at Messina, Sicily.

Deployment and order of battle

The Christian fleet consisted of 206 galleys and six galleasses (large new galleys with substantial artillery, developed by the Venetians) and was commanded by Spanish Admiral John of Austria, the illegitimate son of Emperor Charles V and half-brother of King Philip II of Spain, supported by the Spanish commanders Don Luis de Requesens y Zúñiga and Don Álvaro de Bazán, and Genoan commander Gianandrea Doria. The Republic of Venice contributed 109 galleys and six galleasses, 49 galleys came from the Spanish Empire (including 26 from the Kingdom of Naples, the Kingdom of Sicily, and other Italian territories), 27 galleys of the Genoese fleet, seven galleys from the Papal States, five galleys from the Order of Saint Stephen and the Grand Duchy of Tuscany, three galleys each from the Duchy of Savoy and the Knights of Malta, and some privately owned galleys in Spanish service. This fleet of the Christian alliance was manned by 40,000 sailors and oarsmen. In addition, it carried approximately 30,000 fighting troops: 7,000 Spanish Empire regular infantry of excellent quality,
 (4,000 of the Spanish Empire's troops were drawn from the Kingdom of Naples, mostly Calabria), 7,000 Germans, 6,000 Italian mercenaries in Spanish pay, all good troops, in addition to 5,000 professional Venetian soldiers. Also, Venetian oarsmen were mainly free citizens and able to bear arms, adding to the fighting power of their ships, whereas convicts were used to row many of the galleys in other Holy League squadrons.
Free oarsmen were generally acknowledged to be superior but were gradually replaced in all galley fleets (including those of Venice from 1549) during the 16th century by cheaper slaves, convicts, and prisoners-of-war owing to rapidly rising costs.

Ali Pasha, the Ottoman admiral (Kapudan-i Derya), supported by the corsairs Mehmed Sirocco (natively Mehmed Şuluk) of Alexandria and Uluç Ali, commanded an Ottoman force of 222 war galleys, 56 galliots, and some smaller vessels. The Turks had skilled and experienced crews of sailors but were significantly deficient in their elite corps of Janissaries. The number of oarsmen was about 37,000, virtually all of them slaves, many of them Christians who had been captured in previous conquests and engagements. The Ottoman galleys were manned by 13,000 experienced sailors—generally drawn from the maritime nations of the Ottoman Empire—mainly Berbers, Greeks, Syrians, and Egyptians—and 25,000 soldiers from Ottoman Empire as well as few thousands from their North African allies.

While soldiers on board of the ships were roughly evenly matched in numbers, an advantage for the Christians was the numerical superiority in guns and cannon aboard their ships. It is estimated that the Christians had 1,815 guns, while the Turks had only 750 with insufficient ammunition. The Christians embarked with their much improved arquebusier and musketeer forces, while the Ottomans trusted in their greatly feared composite bowmen.

The Christian fleet started from Messina on 16 September, crossing the Adriatic and creeping along the coast, arriving at the group of rocky islets lying just north of the opening of the Gulf of Corinth on 6 October. Serious conflict had broken out between Venetian and Spanish soldiers, and Venier enraged Don Juan by hanging a Spanish soldier for impudence. Despite bad weather, the Christian ships sailed south and, on 6 October, reached the port of Sami, Cephalonia (then also called Val d'Alessandria), where they remained for a while.

Early on 7 October, they sailed toward the Gulf of Patras, where they encountered the Ottoman fleet. While neither fleet had immediate strategic resources or objectives in the gulf, both chose to engage. The Ottoman fleet had an express order from the Sultan to fight, and John of Austria found it necessary to attack in order to maintain the integrity of the expedition in the face of personal and political disagreements within the Holy League. On the morning of 7 October, after the decision to offer battle was made, the Christian fleet formed up in four divisions in a north–south line:
 At the northern end, closest to the coast, was the Left Division of 53 galleys, mainly Venetian, led by Agostino Barbarigo, with Marco Querini and Antonio da Canale in support.
 The Centre Division consisted of 62 galleys under John of Austria himself in his Real, along with Marcantonio Colonna commanding the papal flagship, Venier commanding the Venetian flagship, Paolo Giordano I Orsini and Pietro Giustiniani, prior of Messina, commanding the flagship of the Knights of Malta.
 The Right Division to the south consisted of another 53 galleys under the Genoese Giovanni Andrea Doria, great-nephew of admiral Andrea Doria.
 A Reserve Division was stationed behind (that is, to the west of) the main fleet, to lend support wherever it might be needed, commanded by Álvaro de Bazán.

Two galleasses, which had side-mounted cannon, were positioned in front of each main division for the purpose, according to Miguel de Cervantes (who served on the galley Marquesa during the battle), of preventing the Turks from sneaking in small boats and sapping, sabotaging, or boarding the Christian vessels. This reserve division consisted of 38 galleys—30 behind the Centre Division and four behind each wing. A scouting group was formed, from two Right Wing and six Reserve Division galleys. As the Christian fleet was slowly turning around Point Scropha, Doria's Right Division, at the offshore side, was delayed at the start of the battle and the Right's galleasses did not get into position.

The Ottoman fleet consisted of 57 galleys and two galliots on its right under Mehmed Siroco, 61 galleys and 32 galliots in the centre under Ali Pasha in the Sultana, and about 63 galleys and 30 galliots in the south offshore under Uluç Ali. A small reserve consisted of eight galleys, 22 galliots, and 64 fustas, behind the centre body. Ali Pasha is supposed to have told his Christian galley slaves, "If I win the battle, I promise you your liberty. If the day is yours, then God has given it to you." John of Austria, more laconically, warned his crew, "There is no paradise for cowards."

Battle 
The lookout on the Real sighted the Turkish van at dawn of 7 October. Don Juan called a council of war and decided to offer battle. He travelled through his fleet in a swift sailing vessel, exhorting his officers and men to do their utmost. The Sacrament was administered to all, the galley slaves were freed from their chains, and the standard of the Holy League was raised to the truck of the flagship.

The wind was at first against the Christians, and it was feared that the Turks would be able to make contact before a line of battle could be formed. But around noon, shortly before contact, the wind shifted to favour the Christians, enabling most of the squadrons to reach their assigned position before contact. Four galeasses stationed in front of the Christian battle line opened fire at close quarters at the foremost Turkish galleys, confusing their battle array in the crucial moment of contact. Around noon, first contact was made between the squadrons of Barbarigo and Sirocco, close to the northern shore of the Gulf. Barbarigo had attempted to stay so close to the shore as to prevent Sirocco from surrounding him, but Sirocco, knowing the depth of the waters, managed to still insert galleys between Barbarigo's line and the coast. In the ensuing mêlée, the ships came so close to each other as to form an almost continuous platform of hand-to-hand fighting in which both leaders were killed. The Christian galley slaves freed from the Turkish ships were supplied with arms and joined in the fighting, turning the battle in favour of the Christian side.

Meanwhile, the centres clashed with such force that Ali Pasha's galley drove into the Real as far as the fourth rowing bench, and hand-to-hand fighting commenced around the two flagships, between the Spanish Tercio infantry and the Turkish janissaries. When the Real was nearly taken, Colonna came alongside, with the bow of his galley, and mounted a counter-attack. With the help of Colonna, the Turks were pushed off the Real and the Turkish flagship was boarded and swept. The entire crew of Ali Pasha's flagship was killed, including Ali Pasha himself. The banner of the Holy League was hoisted on the captured ship, breaking the morale of the Turkish galleys nearby. After two hours of fighting, the Turks were beaten left and centre, although fighting continued for another two hours. A flag taken at Lepanto by the Knights of Saint Stephen, said to be the standard of the Turkish commander, is still on display, in the Church of the seat of the Order in Pisa.

On the Christian right, the situation was different, as Doria continued sailing towards the south instead of taking his assigned position. He would explain his conduct after the battle by saying that he was trying to prevent an enveloping manoeuvre by the Turkish left. But Doria's captains were enraged, interpreting their commander's signals as a sign of treachery. When Doria had opened a wide gap with the Christian centre, Uluç Ali swung around and fell on Colonna's southern flank, with Doria too far away to interfere. Ali attacked a group of some fifteen galleys around the flagship of the Knights of Malta, threatening to break into the Christian centre and still turn the tide of the battle. This was prevented by the arrival of the reserve squadron of Santa Cruz. Uluç Ali was forced to retreat, escaping the battle with the captured flag of the Knights of Malta.

Isolated fighting continued until the evening. Even after the battle had clearly turned against the Turks, groups of janissaries kept fighting to the last. It is said that at some point the Janissaries ran out of weapons and started throwing oranges and lemons at their Christian adversaries, leading to awkward scenes of laughter among the general misery of battle. At the end of the battle, the Christians had taken 117 galleys and 20 galliots, and sunk or destroyed some 50 other ships. Around ten thousand Turks were taken prisoner, and many thousands of Christian slaves were rescued. The Christian side suffered around 7,500 deaths, the Turkish side about 30,000.

Aftermath 

The engagement was a significant defeat for the Ottomans, who had not lost a major naval battle since the fifteenth century. However, the Holy League failed to capitalize on the victory, and while the Ottoman defeat has often been cited as the historical turning-point initiating the eventual stagnation of Ottoman territorial expansion, this was by no means an immediate consequence; even though the Christian victory at Lepanto confirmed the de facto division of the Mediterranean, with the eastern half under firm Ottoman control and the western under the Habsburgs and their Italian allies, halting the Ottoman encroachment on Italian territories, the Holy League did not regain any territories that had been lost to the Ottomans prior to Lepanto. Historian Paul K. Davis synopsizes the importance of Lepanto this way: "This Turkish defeat stopped Ottomans' expansion into the Mediterranean, thus maintaining Western dominance, and confidence grew in the West that Turks, previously unstoppable, could be beaten."

The Ottomans were quick to rebuild their navy. By 1572, about six months after the defeat, more than 150 galleys, 8 galleasses, and in total 250 ships had been built, including eight of the largest capital ships ever seen in the Mediterranean. With this new fleet the Ottoman Empire was able to reassert its supremacy in the Eastern Mediterranean. Sultan Selim II's Chief Minister, the Grand Vizier Mehmed Sokullu, even boasted to the Venetian emissary Marcantonio Barbaro that the Christian triumph at Lepanto caused no lasting harm to the Ottoman Empire, while the capture of Cyprus by the Ottomans in the same year was a significant blow, saying that:

In 1572, the allied Christian fleet resumed operations and faced a renewed Ottoman navy of 200 vessels under Kılıç Ali Pasha, but the Ottoman commander actively avoided engaging the allied fleet and headed for the safety of the fortress of Modon. The arrival of the Spanish squadron of 55 ships evened the numbers on both sides and opened the opportunity for a decisive blow, but friction among the Christian leaders and the reluctance of Don Juan squandered the opportunity.

Pius V died on 1 May 1572. The diverging interests of the League members began to show, and the alliance began to unravel. In 1573, the Holy League fleet failed to sail altogether; instead, Don Juan attacked and took Tunis, only for it to be retaken by the Ottomans in 1574. Venice, fearing the loss of its Dalmatian possessions and a possible invasion of Friuli, and eager to cut its losses and resume the trade with the Ottoman Empire, initiated unilateral negotiations with the Porte.

The Holy League was disbanded with the peace treaty of 7 March 1573, which concluded the War of Cyprus. Venice was forced to accept loser's terms in spite of the victory at Lepanto. Cyprus was formally ceded to the Ottoman Empire, and Venice agreed to pay an indemnity of 300,000 ducats. In addition, the border between the two powers in Dalmatia was modified by the Turkish occupation of small but important parts of the hinterland that included the most fertile agricultural areas near the cities, with adverse effects on the economy of the Venetian cities in Dalmatia. Peace would hold between the two states until the Cretan War of 1645.

In 1574, the Ottomans retook the strategic city of Tunis from the Spanish-supported Hafsid dynasty, which had been re-installed after John of Austria's forces reconquered the city from the Ottomans the year before. Thanks to the long-standing Franco-Ottoman alliance, the Ottomans were able to resume naval activity in the western Mediterranean. In 1576, the Ottomans assisted in Abdul Malik's capture of Fez – this reinforced the Ottoman indirect conquests in Morocco that had begun under Suleiman the Magnificent. The establishment of Ottoman suzerainty over the area placed the entire southern coast of the Mediterranean from the Straits of Gibraltar to Greece under Ottoman authority, with the exceptions of the Spanish-controlled trading city of Oran and strategic settlements such as Melilla and Ceuta. But after 1580, the Ottoman Empire could no longer compete with the advances in European naval technology, especially the development of the galleon and line of battle tactics used in the Spanish Navy. Spanish success in the Mediterranean continued into the first half of the 17th century. Spanish ships attacked the Anatolian coast, defeating larger Ottoman fleets at the Battle of Cape Celidonia and the Battle of Cape Corvo. Larache and La Mamora, in the Moroccan Atlantic coast, and the island of Alhucemas, in the Mediterranean, were taken (although Larache and La Mamora were lost again later in the 17th century). Ottoman expansion in the 17th century shifted to land war with Austria on one hand, culminating in the Great Turkish War of 1683–1699, and to the war with Safavid Persia on the other.

Legacy

Accounts

Giovanni Pietro Contarini's History of the Events, which occurred from the Beginning of the War Brought against the Venetians by Selim the Ottoman, to the Day of the Great and Victorious Battle against the Turks was published in 1572, a few months after Lepanto. It was the first comprehensive account of the war, and the only one to attempt a concise but complete overview of its course and the Holy League's triumph. Contarini's account went beyond effusive praise and mere factual reporting to examine the meaning and importance of these events. It is also the only full historical account by an immediate commentator, blending his straightforward narrative with keen and consistent reflections on the political philosophy of conflict in the context of the Ottoman-Catholic confrontation in the early modern Mediterranean.

Commemoration

The Holy League credited the victory to the Virgin Mary, whose intercession with God they had implored for victory through the use of the Rosary. Andrea Doria had kept a copy of the miraculous image of Our Lady of Guadalupe given to him by King Philip II of Spain in his ship's state room. Pope Pius V instituted a new Catholic feast day of Our Lady of Victory to commemorate the battle, which is now celebrated by the Catholic Church as the feast of Our Lady of the Rosary. Dominican friar Juan Lopez in his 1584 book on the rosary states that the feast of the rosary was offered "in memory and in perpetual gratitude of the miraculous victory that the Lord gave to his Christian people that day against the Turkish armada".A piece of commemorative music composed after the victory is the motet Canticum Moysis (Song of Moses Exodus 15) Pro victoria navali contra Turcas by the Spanish composer based in Rome Fernando de las Infantas. The other piece of music is Jacobus de Kerle's "Cantio octo vocum de sacro foedere contra Turcas" 1572 (Song in Eight Voices on the Holy League Against the Turks), in the opinion of Pettitt (2006) an "exuberantly militaristic" piece celebrating the victory. There were celebrations and festivities with triumphs and pageants at Rome and Venice with Turkish slaves in chains.

The fortress of Palmanova in Italy originally called Palma was built by the Republic of Venice on 7 October 1593 to commemorate the victory.

Paintings

There are many pictorial representations of the battle. Prints of the order of battle appeared in Venice and Rome in 1571, and numerous paintings were commissioned, including one in the Doge's Palace, Venice, by Andrea Vicentino on the walls of the Sala dello Scrutinio, which replaced Tintoretto's Victory of Lepanto, destroyed by fire in 1577. Titian painted the battle in the background of an allegorical work showing Philip II of Spain holding his infant son, Don Fernando, his male heir born shortly after the victory, on 4 December 1571. An angel descends from heaven bearing a palm branch with a motto for Fernando, who is held up by Philip: "Majora tibi" (may you achieve greater deeds; Fernando died as a child, in 1578).

The Allegory of the Battle of Lepanto (c. 1572, oil on canvas, 169 x 137 cm, Gallerie dell'Accademia, Venice) is a painting by Paolo Veronese. The lower half of the painting shows the events of the battle, whilst at the top a female personification of Venice is presented to the Virgin Mary, with Saint Roch, Saint Peter, Saint Justina, Saint Mark and a group of angels in attendance.

A painting by Wenceslas Cobergher, dated to the end of the 16th century, now in San Domenico Maggiore, shows what is interpreted as a victory procession in Rome on the return of admiral Colonna. On the stairs of Saint Peter's Basilica, Pius V is visible in front of a kneeling figure, identified as Marcantonio Colonna returning the standard of the Holy League to the pope. On high is the Madonna and child with victory palms.

Tommaso Dolabella painted his The Battle of Lepanto in c. 1625–1630 on the commission of Stanisław Lubomirski, commander of the Polish left wing in the Battle of Khotyn (1621). The monumental painting (3.05 m × 6.35 m) combines the Polish victory procession following this battle with the backdrop of the Battle of Lepanto. It was later owned by the Dominicans of Poznań and since 1927 has been on display in Wawel Castle, Cracow.<ref>Anna Misiag-Bochenska, Historia obrazu Tomasza Dolabelli " Bitwa pod Lepanto " ", Nautologia 3.1/2 (1968/9), 64–65.
Krystyna Fabijańska-Przybytko, Morze w malarstwie polskim (1990), p. 104. Gino Benzoni,  Il Mediterraneo Nella Seconda Metà Del '500 Alla Luce Di Lepanto (1974), p. 31.</ref>The Battle of Lepanto by Juan Luna (1887) is displayed at the Spanish Senate in Madrid.

Sculpture

The statue of John of Austria in Messina was erected by decision of the city's Senate in 1571, as John had returned to Messina after the battle. It was sculpted by Andrea Calamech and dedicated in 1572.

Poetry and fiction
There was an immediate poetical response to the victory at Lepanto. In Italy alone 233 titles of sonnets, madrigals and poems were printed between 1571 and 1573, some of these including writing in dialect or Latin. This was replicated by the Spanish response, with poems in Catalan and the Mallorcan dialect and full scale epics by Juan Latino (Austriados libri duo 1573), Jerónimo Corte-Real ( Austriada ou Felicissima Victoria, 1578) and :es:Juan Rufo (La Austriada, 1586). Though these longer works have, in the words of a later critic, "not unjustly been consigned to that oblivion which few epics have escaped", there was also a Spanish ballad which retained its popularity and was translated into English by Thomas Rodd in 1818.

The most popular British poem on the subject was The Lepanto by King James VI of Scotland. Written in fourteeners about 1585, its thousand lines were ultimately collected in His Maiesties Poeticall Exercises at Vacant Houres (1591), then published separately in 1603 after James had become king of England too. There were also translations in other languages, including into Dutch as Den Slach van Lepanten (1593) by Abraham van der Myl. La Lepanthe, the French version by Du Bartas, accompanied James' 1591 edition; a Latin version, the Naupactiados Metaphrasis by Thomas Murray (1564–1623), followed a year after James' 1603 publication.

The royal connection ensured that the battle was featured in Stuart aquatic pageants representing sea battles between Christians and Turks well into the reign. And in 1632 the story of the battle was retold in couplets in Abraham Holland's Naumachia. Centuries later G. K. Chesterton revisited the conflict in his lively narrative poem Lepanto, first published in 1911 and republished many times since. It provided a series of poetic visions of the major characters in the battle, particularly the leader of the Christian forces, Don Juan of Austria, then closed with verses linking Miguel de Cervantes, who also fought in the battle, with the "lean and foolish knight" he would later immortalise in Don Quixote.

At the start of the 20th century too, Emilio Salgari devoted his historical novel, Il Leone di Damasco ("The Lion of Damascus", 1910), to the Battle of Lepanto, which was eventually to be adapted to film by Corrado D'Errico in 1942. In 1942 as well, English author Elizabeth Goudge has a character in her war-time novel, The Castle on the Hill (1942), recall the leading role of John of Austria in the battle and the presence of Cervantes there. Much as combatants had appropriated Chesterton's poem to the circumstances of World War I, Goudge harnessed that ancient incident to British resistance to Nazi Germany during World War II.

 See also 

 Lepanto (poem)
 Battle of Ponza (1300)
 Battle of Ponza (1425)
 Battle of Zonchio (1499)
 Battle of Capo d'Orso (1528)
 Battle of Preveza (1538)
 Battle of Djerba (1560)
 Siege of Malta (1565)
 Battle of Gangut (1714)
 Battle of Chesma (1770)
 Battle of Navarino (1827)
 Papal Navy
 Lepanto opening
 Clamavi De Profundis Battle of Lepanto

 References 

 Bibliography 

 
 Anderson, R. C. Naval Wars in the Levant 1559–1853, (2006), 
 
 Beeching, Jack. The Galleys at Lepanto, Hutchinson, London, 1982; 
 Bicheno, Hugh. Crescent and Cross: The Battle of Lepanto 1571, pbk., Phoenix, London, 2004, 
 
 Braudel, Fernand. The Mediterranean in the Age of Philip II. (vol 2 1972), the classic history by the leader of the French Annales School; excerpt and text search vol 2 pp 1088–1142
 Chesterton, G. K. Lepanto with Explanatory Notes and Commentary, Dale Ahlquist, ed. (San Francisco: Ignatius Press, 2003). 
 
 Cakir, İbrahim Etem, "Lepanto War and Some Informatıon on the Reconstructıon of The Ottoman Fleet", Turkish Studies – International Periodical For The Language Literature and History of Turkish or Turkic, Volume 4/3 Spring 2009, pp. 512–31
 Contarini, Giovanni Pietro. Kiril Petkov, ed and trans. From Cyprus to Lepanto: History of the Events, Which Occurred from the Beginning of the War Brought against the Venetians by Selim the Ottoman, to the Day of the Great and Victorious Battle against the Turks. Italica Press, 2019.  
 Cook, M.A. (ed.), "A History of the Ottoman Empire to 1730", Cambridge University Press, 1976; 
 Crowley, Roger Empires of the Sea: The siege of Malta, the battle of Lepanto and the contest for the center of the world, Random House, 2008. 
 Currey, E. Hamilton, "Sea-Wolves of the Mediterranean", John Murrey, 1910
 
 
 Guilmartin, John F. (1974) Gunpowder & Galleys: Changing Technology & Mediterranean Warfare at Sea in the 16th Century. Cambridge University Press, London. .
 
 Hanson, Victor D. Carnage and Culture: Landmark Battles in the Rise of Western Power, Anchor Books, 2001. Published in the UK as Why the West has Won, Faber and Faber, 2001. . Includes a chapter about the battle of Lepanto
 

 Hess, Andrew C. "The Battle of Lepanto and Its Place in Mediterranean History", Past and Present, No. 57. (Nov., 1972), pp. 53–73
 
 Konstam, Angus, Lepanto 1571: The Greatest Naval Battle of the Renaissance. Osprey Publishing, Oxford. 2003. 
 
 Harbottle's Dictionary of Battles, third revision by George Bruce, 1979
 Parker, Geoffrey (1996) The Military Revolution: Military Innovation and the Rise of the West, 1500–1800. (second edition) Cambridge University Press, Cambridge. 
 Stouraiti, Anastasia, 'Costruendo un luogo della memoria: Lepanto', Storia di Venezia – Rivista 1 (2003), 65–88.
 Warner, Oliver Great Sea Battles (1968) has "Lepanto 1571" as its opening chapter. 
 The New Cambridge Modern History, Volume I – The Renaissance 1493–1520, edited by G. R. Potter, Cambridge University Press 1964
 Wheatcroft, Andrew (2004). Infidels: A History of the Conflict between Christendom and Islam. Penguin Books.
 J. P. Jurien de la Gravière, La Guerre de Chypre et la Bataille de Lépante (1888).
 Luis Coloma, The Story of Don John of Austria, trans. Lady Moreton, New York: John Lane Company, 1912 (online transcription of pp. 265–71 ).
 Christopher Check, The Battle that Saved the Christian West, This Rock 18.3 (March 2007).
 Lepanto – Rudolph, Harriet, "Die Ordnung der Schlacht und die Ordnung der Erinnerung"   in: Militärische Erinnerungskulturen vom 14. bis zum 19. Jahrhundert (2012),  101–28.
 Guilmartin, John F. "The Tactics of the Battle of Lepanto Clarified: The Impact of Social, Economic, and Political Factors on Sixteenth Century Galley Warfare", in Craig L. Symonds (ed.), New Aspects of Naval History: Selected Papers Presented at the Fourth Naval History Symposium, United States Naval Academy 25–26 October 1979,  Annapolis, Maryland: the United States Naval Institute (1981),  41–65.

External links
Battle of Lepanto, In Our Time'' episode, hosted by Melvin Bragg, 12 November 2015, with guests Noel Malcolm, Diarmaid MacCulloch, and Kate Fleet.
 Julián Jaramillo, La batalla de Lepanto (historia-maritima.blogspot.com, 2012).
 Henry Zaidan, 57 Paintings of The Naval Battle of Lepanto, 1571. Christian forces of the Holy League and the Ottoman Turks (myartblogcollection.blogspot.com, 2016)

 
1571 in the Ottoman Empire
1571 in Italy
Conflicts in 1571
History of Aetolia-Acarnania
Ionian Sea
Nafpaktos
Naval battles of the Ottoman–Venetian Wars
Naval battles involving the Ottoman Empire
Naval battles involving the Republic of Venice
Naval battles involving the Republic of Genoa
Naval battles involving Savoy
Naval battles involving Spain
Naval battles involving the Knights Hospitaller
Naval battles involving the Papal States